Dyurtyuli (Dürtöylö) is a rural locality (a selo) and the administrative centre of Dyurtyulinsky Selsoviet, Sharansky District, Bashkortostan, Russia. The population was 582 as of 2010. There are 6 streets.

Geography 
Dyurtyuli is located 23 km southwest of Sharan (the district's administrative centre) by road. Yeremkino is the nearest rural locality.

References 

Rural localities in Sharansky District